Stenoptilia bipunctidactyla, also known as the twin-spot plume is a moth of the Pterophoroidea family found in North Africa, Asia and Europe. It was first described by the Austrian physician and naturalist, Giovanni Antonio Scopoli in 1763. It is one of four similar looking moths.

Description
The wingspan is 17–25 mm. The moths fly from dusk, in two overlapping generations from March to October, depending on location. They are also attracted to light.

Similar species
This moth may be an aggregate of species with similar looking wings and is part of the Stenoptilia bipunctidactyla group of four species which all look similar. The other moths of this group are, 
 small scabious plume (Stenoptilia annadactyla)
 scarce plume (Stenoptilia inopinata)
 Gregson's plume (Stenoptilia scabiodactylus)

Early stages
The larvae feed on devil's-bit scabious (Succisa pratensis), common toadflax (Linaria vulgaris), weasel's snout (Misopates orontium), small scabious (Scabiosa columbaria) and widow flower (Knautia species). There are differences in the early and intermediate larval instars which may be two different species or the variation may be due to diet, season or normal variation within the species. Larvae found on one foodplant can be reared on the other foodplant. They overwinter as an early instar. Spring generation larvae feed within a stem and some, later in a folded leaf, while the summer generation feed in the flowers.

Pupae are attached to the larval foodplant or to a nearby stem.

Distribution
The twin-spot plume is found in Europe, Asia Minor, Syria, North Africa and Iran.

References

External links
 Microlepidoptera.nl 

bipunctidactyla
Moths described in 1763
Plume moths of Africa
Plume moths of Asia
Plume moths of Europe
Taxa named by Giovanni Antonio Scopoli